The Girls' Singles tournament of the 2013 Asian Junior Badminton Championships was held from July 10–14 in Kota Kinabalu, Malaysia. The defending champion of the last edition was P. V. Sindhu from India. Busanan Ongbumrungpan, Hana Ramadhini, and Aya Ohori were the top 3 seeded this year. Ohori emerged as the champion after defeat Ongbumrungpan of Thailand in the finals with the score 21–11, 16–21, 21–13. It was the first time ever for Japan to win the gold medal in the girls' singles event.

Seeded

  Busanan Ongbumrungpan (final)
  Hana Ramadhini (third round)
  Aya Ohori (champion)
  Kim Hyo-min (quarter-final)
  Liang Xiaoyu (quarter-final)
  Ruthvika Shivani (quarter-final)
  Sarita Suwannakitborihan (third round)
  Pornpawee Chochuwong (third round)

Draw

Finals

Top Half

Section 1

Section 2

Section 3

Section 4

Bottom Half

Section 5

Section 6

Section 7

Section 8

References

External links 
Main Draw (Archived 2013-07-13)

2013 Asian Junior Badminton Championships
Junior